Shimon Gad Elituv (24 February 1937 – 25 January 2023) was an Israeli rabbi and member of the Mateh Binyamin Regional Council, the Chief Rabbinate Council, rabbi of Mevasseret Zion, chairman of the Committee of Rabbis and communities in the Diaspora, member of the Presidium Council of the Alliance of Rabbis in Islamic States and Jerusalem rabbis of Chabad-Lubavitch.

Elituv served for ten years as rabbi of the Halabi Community "sukkah of David" in Buenos Aires, Argentina.

References 

1937 births
2023 deaths
Israeli expatriates in Argentina
Israeli Hasidic rabbis
Argentine Orthodox rabbis
People from Jerusalem